A hyperforeignism is a type of qualitative hypercorrection that involves speakers misidentifying the distribution of a pattern found in loanwords and extending it to other environments, including words and phrases not borrowed from the language that the pattern derives from. The result of this process does not reflect the rules of either language.

Hyperforeignisms can manifest in a number of ways, including the application of the spelling or pronunciation rules of one language to a word borrowed from another, an incorrect application of a language's pronunciation, and pronouncing loanwords as though they were borrowed more recently. Hyperforeignisms may similarly occur when a word is thought to be a loanword from a particular language when it is not.

They are a way of poking fun at those who earnestly adopt foreign-sounding pronunciations of pseudo-loanwords.

Similarly, speakers who echo hyperforeign pronunciations without the intention of approximating a foreign-language pattern are also not practicing hyperforeignization; thus, pronouncing habanero as if it were spelled habañero is not a hyperforeignism if one is not aware that the word has been borrowed from Spanish.

English
In English, hyperforeignisms are seen in loanwords from many different languages. Many examples of hyperforeignisms are isolated examples, rather than ones showing a particular pattern applied to multiple words and phrases, though some patterns can be identified.

The city name Munich, normally , is occasionally pronounced /ˈmʏnɪç/ or similar, as though representing a German "Münich," even though Munich is an English name and the German name of the city is München.

Dutch words

The cluster /sx/ is not present is English phonology, and is found difficult by most native speakers, so that some level of correction away from the Dutch original is inevitable.

French words
A number of words of French origin feature a final  that is pronounced in English but silent in the original language. In French, the final  is silent and the word is pronounced . The word cadre is sometimes pronounced  in English, as though it were of Spanish origin.

Legal English is replete with words derived from Norman French, which for a long time was the language of the courts in England and Wales. The correct pronunciation of Norman French is often closer to a natural contemporary English reading than to modern French: the attempt to pronounce these phrases as if they were modern French could therefore be considered to be a hyperforeignism. For example, the clerk's summons "Oyez!"

A common pattern is pronouncing French loanwords without a word-final , as with derrière, peignoir, and répertoire. Yet at once, this is a normal pronunciation in French vernacular of North America (both Canadian French and Acadian French, by opposition with Metropolitan French probably used for making this comparison): /r/ is optional as word ending, whereas the vowel just behind it is always long, contrasting with vowels being almost always short in word-ending positions.

Another common pattern, influenced by French morphophonology, is the omission of word-final consonants. Hyperforeign application of this tendency occurs with omission of these consonants in words with final consonants that are pronounced in French. Other examples of this include Vichyssoise, the chess term en prise, prix fixe, sous-vide and mise en scène. There are many instances of this sort of omission connected with proper nouns.

The Norman French language furthermore gave Southern England some ancient family names that were once associated with the aristocracy. An example is Lestrange which is sometimes pronounced with its natural and contemporaneous French inflection, though it is more often pronounced like the English word strange, .

Similarly, the French-derived term repartie ("rejoinder") was changed to English spelling  ("banter"), giving rise to a hyperforeign .

Claret is often pronounced , without a final . However, it is historically an Anglicised (and genericised) version of the original French clairet, with the  more typically being pronounced and the stress falling on the first syllable: .

Moët, a brand of French champagne, is often pronounced with a silent T. However, the name is Dutch, and its native pronunciation is [moɛt] .

Hindi words

Italian words

The name of the principal male character in Shakespeare's The Taming of the Shrew is spelled , intended to be the Italian name Petruccio , reflecting more conventional English pronunciation rules that use  to represent . However, the name is commonly pronounced , as though Shakespeare's spelling were genuinely Italian.

Substituting baristo for a male barista, when in fact barista is invariable in gender in Italian and Spanish (as are other words ending in the suffix -ista) is a hyperforeignism. In Italian (and Spanish), the gender is indicated by the article; il (el) barista for a male and la barista for a female.

However, latte has no accent mark in Italian and has the stress on the first syllable. This may be an analogy with French words such as frappé , where there is such an accent mark.

Mandarin words
The Pinyin letter  is pronounced .

Russian words
Because the Russian loanword dacha (дача ) looks like it could be German, the pronunciation , with a velar fricative, shows an attempt at marking a word as foreign, but with a sound not originally present in the source word.

Spanish words
The digraph  of Spanish generally represents , similar to English . Hyperforeign realizations of many Spanish loanwords or proper names may substitute other sounds. Examples include a French-style  in the surname Chávez and in Che Guevara, or a German-influenced  or Ancient Greek-influenced  in machismo. This is not the pronunciation of present-day Spanish, however.

Some English speakers pronounce certain words of Spanish origin as if they had an eñe or Ll when they do not in the original language. For example, the word habanero is pronounced  (with an n) in Spanish. English speakers may instead pronounce it , as if it were spelled ; the phenomenon also occurs with empanada, which may be pronounced as if spelled . The city of Cartagena, Colombia is very commonly pronounced as if it were spelled .

The South American beverage, mate, is frequently spelled  in English, adding an accent which, in Spanish, changes the pronunciation and meaning of the word (maté meaning "I killed" in Spanish). The accented spelling may however serve a purpose, as it is interpreted by some English speakers to indicate that the word has two syllables and is not pronounced like the English word mate. Following Spanish orthography though, the only correct place to add an accent which matches the natural stress of the word (and therefore does not change its pronunciation) would be on the A, máte.

Other languages

Polish
Hyperforeignisms occur in Polish sometimes with English loanwords or names. One example would be the name Roosevelt, which is pronounced , as if it started like goose, even though a natural Polish pronunciation would be closer to the English one.

Phenian, now obsolete name for Pyongyang, which was a transcription of Russian , was pronounced , as if ⟨ph⟩ represented the voiceless labiodental fricative like in English.

Loanwords from Japanese are often subject to hyperforeignism. The names of three of the four main islands of Japan, Honsiu, Kiusiu, and Sikoku, are already Polish transcriptions with close approximations of Japanese sounds—, and —but are often pronounced with changing native  into foreign . Other Japanese words use English transcription, which causes further problems.

Russian

In Russian, many early loanwords are pronounced as native Russian words with full palatalization. Hyperforeignism occurs when some speakers pronounce these early loanwords without palatalization. For example: тема ("theme") is normally pronounced . A hyperforeign pronunciation would be , as if the word were spelled . Similarly, текст ("text") is pronounced , with the hyperforeign pronunciation being , as if it were spelled . Other examples include музей ("museum")  → , газета ("newspaper")  →  and эффект ("effect")  → . The variation is attributable to the tendency to use  in foreign words after a consonant, even if it is not palatalized.

Norwegian

Like in Swedish, in Norwegian entrecôte can be pronounced without the final .

See also
Metal umlaut

Notes

References

Language varieties and styles
Linguistic error
Phonology